Hans Christian Andersen (24 February 1914 – 20 March 1993) was a Danish equestrian. He completed at the 1952 Summer Olympics and the 1956 Summer Olympics.

References

External links
 

1914 births
1993 deaths
Danish male equestrians
Olympic equestrians of Denmark
Equestrians at the 1952 Summer Olympics
Equestrians at the 1956 Summer Olympics
Sportspeople from Odense